Choices II: The Setup is the seventh studio album by  American hip hop group Three 6 Mafia. The album was released on March 29, 2005, by Sony Records. The CD is the soundtrack to the DVD movie with which it is packaged.

Track listing
All tracks are produced by DJ Paul and Juicy J

References

2005 albums
Three 6 Mafia albums
Albums produced by DJ Paul
Albums produced by Juicy J